Troides prattorum, the Buru Opalescent Birdwing, is a species of butterfly in the family Papilionidae. It is endemic to Buru in the Maluku Islands of Indonesia.

It is commercially bred, but supplies of this butterfly are sporadic, so it is still very rare in collections.

Related species
Troides prattorum is a member of the Troides aeacus species group. The members of this clade are:

Troides aeacus  C. & R. Felder, 1860
Troides magellanus  (C. & R. Felder, 1862)
Troides minos (Cramer, [1779])
Troides rhadamantus (Lucas, 1835)
Troides dohertyi (Rippon, 1893)
Troides prattorum (Joicey & Talbot, 1922)

References

ARKive Photos and more information
Ohya, Takashi,1980) Troides prattorum. Rhopalocerists' Magazine 4(4):5-10, plate.
Kurt Rumbucher; Béla von Knötgen, 1999 Part.6, Papilionidae. 3, Troides. 1 aeacus- group in Erich Bauer and Thomas Frankenbach Eds. Butterflies of the World  Keltern: Goecke & Evers 1999.

External links

Butterflycorner Images from Naturhistorisches Museum Wien (English/German)
Tropical and subtropical moist broadleaf forests. Buru Ecoregion

prattorum
Butterflies of Indonesia
Endemic fauna of Indonesia
Fauna of Buru
Taxonomy articles created by Polbot
Butterflies described in 1922